The 2020–21 Old Dominion Monarchs men’s basketball team represented Old Dominion University in the 2020–21 NCAA Division I men's basketball season. The Monarchs, led by eighth-year head coach Jeff Jones, played their home games at Chartway Arena in Norfolk, Virginia as members of the East Division of Conference USA.

Previous season
The Monarchs finished the 2019–20 season 13–19, 9–9 in C-USA play to finish in a tie for seventh place. In the C-USA tournament, they were defeated in the first round by Florida Atlantic.

Roster

Schedule and results 

|-
!colspan=12 style=| Non-conference regular season

|-
!colspan=12 style=| C-USA regular season

|-
!colspan=12 style=| Conference USA tournament
|-

|-

Source

References

Old Dominion Monarchs men's basketball seasons
Old Dominion Monarchs
Old Dominion Monarchs basketball
Old Dominion Monarchs basketball